The 1820 United States presidential election in Vermont took place between November 1 to December 6, 1820, as part of the 1820 United States presidential election. The state legislature chose eight representatives, or electors to the Electoral College, who voted for President and Vice President.

During this election, Vermont cast its eight electoral votes to Democratic Republican candidate and incumbent President James Monroe.

Effectively, the 1820 presidential election was an election with no campaign, since there was no serious opposition to Monroe and Tompkins. In fact, they won all the electoral votes barring one from neighboring New Hampshire, which was cast for Secretary of State John Quincy Adams.

See also
 United States presidential elections in Vermont

References

Vermont
1820
1820 Vermont elections